The Electric River is a river of Fiordland, New Zealand. It arises around Lake Jaquiery in the Kaherekoau Mountains and flows eastward into Lake Monowai at June Bay.

See also
List of rivers of New Zealand

References

Land Information New Zealand - Search for Place Names

Rivers of Fiordland